The ice hockey team rosters at the 1976 Winter Olympics consisted of the following players:

Austria
Daniel Gritsch, Gerhard Hausner, Michael Herzog, Rudolf König, Sepp Kriechbaum, Max Moser, Herbert Mörtl, Günter Oberhuber, Herbert Pöck, Sepp Puschnig, Othmar Russ, Alexander Sadjina, Franz Schilcher, Walter Schneider, Johann Schuller, Josef Schwitzer, Franz Voves, Peter Zini

Bulgaria
Ivan Atanasov, Malin Atanasov, Iliya Bachvarov, Marin Bachvarov, Kiril Gerasimov, Atanas Iliev, Georgi Iliev, Ivaylo Kalev, Dimo Krastinov, Dimitri Lazarov, Lyubomir Lyubomirov, Ivan Markovski, Nikolay Mikhaylov, Bozhidar Minchev, Milcho Nenov, Ivan Penelov, Nikolay Petrov, Petar Radev

Czechoslovakia
Josef Augusta, Jiří Bubla, Milan Chalupa, Jiří Crha, Miroslav Dvořák, Bohuslav Ebermann, Ivan Hlinka, Jiří Holeček, Jiří Holík, Milan Kajkl, Oldřich Machač, Vladimír Martinec, Eduard Novák,  Jiří Novák, Milan Nový, František Pospíšil, Jaroslav Pouzar, Bohuslav Šťastný, Pavol Svitana

Finland
Seppo Ahokainen, Hannu Haapalainen, Matti Hagman, Hannu Kapanen, Pertti Koivulahti, Tapio Koskinen, Reijo Laksola, Antti Leppänen, Henry Leppä, Seppo Lindström, Pekka Marjamäki, Matti Murto, Timo Nummelin, Esa Peltonen, Matti Rautiainen, Timo Saari, Jorma Vehmanen, Urpo Ylönen

Japan
Takeshi Akiba, Takeshi Azuma, Kiyoshi Esashika, Tsutomu Hanzawa, Sadaki Honma, Hiroshi Hori, Yoshio Hoshino, Minoru Ito, Yoshiaki Kyoya, Minoru Misawa, Hitoshi Nakamura, Iwao Nakayama, Toshimitsu Otsubo, Hideo Sakurai, Yasushio Tanaka, Hideo Urabe, Osamu Wakabayashi, Koji Wakasa

Poland
Stefan Chowaniec, Robert Góralczyk, Andrzej Iskrzycki, Kordian Jajszczok, Mieczysław Jaskierski, Wiesław Jobczyk, Marian Kajzerek, Leszek Kokoszka, Walery Kosyl, Marek Marcińczak, Tadeusz Obłój, Jerzy Potz, Henryk Pytel, Andrzej Słowakiewicz, Andrzej Tkacz, Andrzej Zabawa, Walenty Ziętara, Karol Żurek

Romania
Elöd Antal, Dumitru Axinte, Marian Costea, Șandor Gal, Ioan Gheorghiu, Alexandru Hălăucă, Vasile Huțanu, Ion Ioniță, George Justinian, Tiberiu Mikloș, Vasile Morar, Doru Moroșan, Valerian Netedu, Eduard Pană, Marian Pisaru, Doru Tureanu, Dezideriu Varga, Nicolae Vișan

Soviet Union
Boris Alexandrov, Sergei Babinov, Alexander Gusev, Sergei Kapustin, Valeri Kharlamov, Yuri Lyapkin, Vladimir Lutchenko, Alexander Maltsev, Boris Mikhailov, Vladimir Petrov, Vladimir Shadrin, Viktor Shalimov, Alexander Sidelnikov, Vladislav Tretiak, Gennady Tsygankov, Valeri Vasiliev, Alexander Yakushev, Viktor Zhluktov

Switzerland
Jürg Berger, Guy Dubois, Walter Dürst, Charles Henzen, Ueli Hofmann, Renzo Holzer, Andre Jorns, Jakob Kölliker, Ernst Lüthi, Nando Mathieu, Georg Mattli, Andreas Meyer, Alfio Molina, Anton Neininger, Bernhard Neininger, Rolf Tschiemer, Daniel Widmer, Aldo Zenhäusern

United States
Steve Alley, Daniel Bolduc, Blane Comstock, Bob Dobek, Rob Harris, Jeffrey Hymanson, Paul Jensen, Steve Jensen, Dick Lamby, Bob Lundeen, Bob Miller, Douglas Ross, Gary Ross, Buzz Schneider, Steve Sertich, John Taft, Ted Thorndike, Jim Warden

West Germany
Klaus Auhuber, Ignaz Berndaner, Wolfgang Boos, Lorenz Funk, Martin Hinterstocker, Anton Kehle, Udo Kiessling, Walter Köberle, Ernst Köpf, Erich Kühnhackl, Stefan Metz, Rainer Philipp, Franz Reindl, Alois Schloder, Rudolf Thanner, Josef Völk, Ferenc Vozar, Erich Weishaupt

Yugoslavia
Janez Albreht, Božidar Beravs, Miroslav Gojanović, Eduard Hafner, Gorazd Hiti, Bogdan Jakopič, Ignac Kavec, Bojan Kumar, Miroslav Lap, Tomaž Lepša, Janez Petač, Silvo Poljanšek, Janez Puterle, Drago Savić, Ivan Ščap, Roman Smolej, Franci Žbontar, Marjan Žbontar

References

Sources

Hockey Hall Of Fame page on the 1976 Olympics

Jeux Olympiques 1976

rosters
1976